Pati Parmeshwar is a Hindi film. It was released in 1989 and stars Dimple Kapadia. The film was released following a court battle with the Central Board of Film Certification (CBFC), where it was banned for screening due to its perceived glorification of submissiveness of women. The CBFC ruled to ban the film's screening, refusing to rate it, because of the portrayal of the character of Rekha, the forgiving wife who the CBFC thought was in "ignoble servility" of her husband. The Bombay Court found the ban unjustified.

Cast
Dimple Kapadia ... Tara/Durga     
Shekhar Suman ... Vijay
Sudha Chandran ... Rekha
Rajesh Puri   
Alok Nath
Om Shivpuri ... Rekha's father

References

External links
 

1989 films
1980s Hindi-language films